Ricardo Holler (born 19 August 1962) is an Argentine cross-country skier. He competed in the men's 15 kilometre event at the 1984 Winter Olympics.

References

External links
 

1962 births
Living people
Argentine male cross-country skiers
Olympic cross-country skiers of Argentina
Cross-country skiers at the 1984 Winter Olympics
Skiers from Buenos Aires